This is a list of philosophy-related events in the 11th century.

Events

Publications 
Alberic of Monte Cassino wrote on the Eucharistic Controversy, opposing the views of Berengar. This was a significant moment in moving the dispute away from hermeneutics and philosophy towards a theological approach preferred by the prelates.

Births 
 Peter Damian (c. 1007-1072 or 1073). Reforming Benedictine monk and cardinal in the circle of Pope Leo IX. A Doctor of the Church who often condemned philosophy.
Anselm was born in either 1033 or 1034.
 Peter Abelard (1079-1142). French scholastic philosopher, theologian and preeminent logician.
 Judah Halevi (c.1075-1141), Spanish Jewish philosopher, poet and physician.

Deaths 
 Miskawayh (932-1030), Persian official and philosopher
Avicena (980-1037)
 Peter Damian (c. 1007-1072 or 1073) Reforming Benedictine monk and cardinal in the circle of Pope Leo IX; a Doctor of the Church who often condemned philosophy

See also
List of centuries in philosophy

References 
Frederick Denison Maurice. Moral and Metaphysical Philosophy. Macmillan and Co. London. 1873. Volume 1 (Ancient philosophy and the first to the thirteenth centuries). Chapter 3 ("From the Beginning of the Tenth to the End of the Eleventh Century"). Page 502 at page 506 et seq.
Bertrand Russell. History of Western Philosophy: Collectors Edition. Chapter 9.
John Marenbon. Early Medieval Philosophy 480-1150: An Introduction. Second Edition. Routledge. 1988. Chapter 8. Page 80 et seq. Chapter 9. Page 90 et seq. See also passim. Snippet view.
Sir Anthony Kenny. An Illustrated Brief History of Western Philosophy. Second Edition. Blackwell Publishing. 2006. Chapter 7 at page 128 et seq.

Medieval philosophy
Philosophy by century